Sir Donald Charles Cameron,  (3 June 1872 – 8 January 1948) was a British colonial governor. He was the second governor of the British mandate of Tanganyika, and later the governor of Nigeria.

Biography
Cameron was born 3 June 1872 in British Guiana (now Guyana), the son of a sugar planter called Donald Charles Cameron and Mary Emily (née Brassington). He went to Rathmines School in Dublin, and never attended university. In 1890, he returned to British Guiana and began work as a clerk in the Inland Revenue department of the civil service. In 1904, Cameron travelled to Mauritius as assistant Colonial Secretary under Sir Cavendish Boyle. He moved to Southern Nigeria in 1908 and was central secretary under Sir Frederick Lugard. He became influenced by Lugard's ideas of indirect rule.

In April 1925, Cameron became the second governor of the British mandate of Tanganyika, taking over from John Scott, who was acting governor for Sir Horace Byatt. In 1926, Sir Edward Grigg who at the time was the Governor of British Kenya, called a conference in Nairobi to discuss closer union of Britain's East African colonies of Kenya, Uganda and Tanganyika, which Sir William Frederick Gowers of Uganda fully supported. However, Governor Donald Charles Cameron of Tanganyika was firmly against it, thinking it would be unjust to Africans. After a somewhat prolongued diplomatic back and forth Governor Cameron prevailed in making sure that no land in Tanganyika would be taken away from native Africans and given to white settlers. From 1931 to 1935 he was governor and commander-in-chief of Nigeria. Cameron also disagreed with Grigg about the issue of enforcing bans on certain cultural practices such as female circumcision. In Kenya Grigg had attempted to use force to "stamp out the practice," by both declaring it illegal and by arresting any man found to have committed it. Cameron disagreed with this approach and believed being "heavy handed" would "backfire" and that the British should instead try to persuade people to give up such practices. On this note Cameron said "time and great patience are needed and a realization that attempts at coercion and isolated prohibitions will inevitably cause a revulsion against our culture and our religion and a disposition to reject our help..."

Personal life
In 1903, Cameron married Gertrude Gittens, the daughter of a sugar planter in Barbados. They had one son who died in an aircraft accident at sea in 1941. Donald Cameron retired in 1935 and died 8 January 1948 in London, aged 75.

Bibliography

References

External links
 

1872 births
1948 deaths
People from Georgetown, Guyana
Governors of Tanganyika (territory)
Knights Commander of the Order of the British Empire
Knights Grand Cross of the Order of St Michael and St George
History of Lagos
History of Nigeria
British Governors and Governors-General of Nigeria